Orkhon is a sum (district) of Darkhan-Uul Province in northern Mongolia. In 2009, its population was 3,185., being the northernmost city in the Darkhan-Uul Province.

Population
At the 2009 population census, Orkhon was the least populated city in the Darkhan-Uul Province with a estimated population of 3,185

References 

Populated places in Mongolia
Districts of Darkhan-Uul Province